American Wrestlers is the debut studio album by indie rock act American Wrestlers, initially self-released on BandCamp in 2014, and re-released on April 7, 2015 on Fat Possum Records. The album was recorded entirely by Gary McLure on an eight-track Tascam recorder.

Background and recording
In 2014, following the break-up of Gary McLure's band, Working for a Nuclear Free City, and the release of his debut solo album, Wreaths (2013), McLure moved to St. Louis, Missouri to marry his then-girlfriend, Bridget Imperial. McClure subsequently purchased an eight-track Tascam recorder and a bass guitar at a local pawn shop and recorded American Wrestlers at his new home. Regarding the album's lo-fi recording process, McClure noted, "The last time I recorded on like a 4-track or an 8-track was when I was like thirteen/fourteen in my bedroom, and this is the first thing I've recorded on 8-tracks since then."

Writing and composition
The track, "Kelly", is partly written about Kelly Thomas, an American homeless man that was beaten to death by the police, in 2011. Gary McClure noted, "It concerns some other things too: parts of America. Parts of people. Artless strips of neon over a trough that spreads further than any animal could ever walk."

Regarding the album's opening and closing tracks, "There's No One Crying Over Me Either" and "Left", McClure stated: "They’re both songs about human failures to connect in an open, real and faithfully exposed way because of being unable to let go of the feeling of being special, which is something produced by the ego."

Reception

American Wrestlers has received mostly favorable reviews from music critics. At Metacritic, which assigns a normalized rating out of 100 to reviews from mainstream critics, the album received an average score of 74 based on 7 reviews, indicating "generally favorable reviews".

In a very positive review for the album, Allmusic's Mark Deming wrote: "The debut album from American Wrestlers confirms that the lo-fi aesthetic is still going strong in the 21st century [...] The result is one of the best crummy-sounding pop albums of recent memory."

Track listing

References

Fat Possum Records albums
2014 debut albums
American Wrestlers albums